Creative & Cultural Skills is one of the Sector Skills Councils established by the UK Government in 2005 to foster the development of a skilled workforce.

Function
It covers crafts, cultural heritage, jewelry, design, music, performing, literary and visual arts. It was created to bridge the gap between industry, education and the government, as well as to give employers an effective influence over education and the skills developed in the U.K.

Structure
Its founder chair is Tony Hall, Baron Hall of Birkenhead (2004–2009). The founder Chief Executive is Tom Bewick (2004–2010). The current chair is Paul Latham of Live Nation. The current Chief Executive is Pauline Tambling. The Trustees are Kim Bromley-Derry, Roisin McDonagh from the  Arts Council of Northern Ireland, Oliver Morris, UK Music, Martin Penny, David Anderson, National Museum Wales, Alex Porter-Smith, Carol Harvey-Barnes, Clare Hawkins and Vilma Nikolaidou.

Creative & Cultural Skills' registered office is The Backstage Centre, High House Purfleet, Essex which it built and opened in 2013. Its staff are based across England, Wales and Northern Ireland.

National Skills Academy for Creative & Cultural
Established in April 2009, the National Skills Academy for Creative & Cultural is a network of more than 500 employers from the creative industries and over 40 Further Education Colleges across nine English regions, Scotland, Northern Ireland, and Wales. Its Founder Chair is Paul Latham, Chief Operating Officer for International Live Music at Live Nation, and its Managing Director is Pauline Tambling CBE.

Throughout the year, the Academy runs various events, including Careers events and an annual industry conference. In Autumn 2010, for example, the Academy delivered 25 career events across the nation which featured practical and informative day programmes focusing on backstage, technical, and administrative roles in the industry. Additionally, NSA Founder Colleges and Industry Members collaborate to provide teenagers with the opportunity to get a taste of what goes on behind the scenes of the world’s biggest events, as well as giving them the chance to tackle professionally set challenges as part of their course work.

Creative & Cultural Skills also maintains Creative Choices, a website specifically for young people which provides information and advice about creative careers. Features include 'Ask an Expert', where users can ask questions to people already working in the industry.

Since 2013, Creative & Cultural Skills has been running the Creative Employment Programme, which is funded with a £15 million grant from Arts Lottery through Arts Council England. This programme incentivises creative sector employers to take on apprentices and paid interns.

The Backstage Centre
The Skills Academy has developed a technical theatre, events and music training centre called The Backstage Centre in Purfleet, Essex as part of High House Production Park at High House Purfleet. The building houses training that could not otherwise be delivered nationally due to space and time restrictions in existing technical theatre training and performance spaces, and exposes learners to top level, world class technical theatre and live music professionals, companies and bands in a unique training environment. The design incorporates a large main space of 875m² with a 17m ceiling and a number of other training spaces including a CAD studio, lighting and audio-visual training studios, generic training spaces, a recording studio and band rehearsal room. These spaces offer access to a wide variety of technical performance media and support the transferability of skills and knowledge. The building has been open for business since May 2012.

References

2004 establishments in the United Kingdom
Arts in the United Kingdom
Education in Thurrock
Sector Skills Councils